The Red Bull MotoGP Rookies Cup is a motorcycle racing series contested by young, up-and-coming motorcycle riders, who have not had experience in a motorcycle grand prix previously. The class was founded in 2007, and since then a number of the rookies have progressed through to the 125cc/Moto3 championship in MotoGP.

Prior to the 2013 season, a 2-stroke KTM RC 125cc engine was used. The year 2013 saw a change of machinery to the 4-stroke KTM RC250RBR, following the introduction of the four-stroke Moto3 class.

The Spaniard José Antonio Rueda was the first racer to win the Cup title and his first World Championship title in the same year (2022).

Seventeen ex Rookies have gone on to win a world championship as of 2022:

So far, ten ex Rookie riders have started a race in the MotoGP class as of 2022 (active riders in bold):

Data correct as of January 2023

Scoring system

Points are awarded to the top fifteen finishers. A rider has to finish the race to earn points.

 Each rider's lowest score discounted. (2007-08 Only)

Bike Spec

Results

Records

References

External links
Official Site

 
Motorcycle road racing series